SPT-CLJ2106-5844 is a galaxy cluster located 7.5 billion light years from Earth. It was discovered by scientists from the South Pole Telescope Collaboration, using the South Pole Telescope. With a weight of about 1.27 × 1015 solar masses, it is the most massive distant object known, as of 2011. It is about 60% heavier than previously known object detected in 2008, SPT-CL J0546-5345.

This galaxy cluster was found in the South Pole Telescope Sunyaev-Zel'dovich (SPT-SZ) survey. This survey was done using the Advanced Camera for Surveys and Wide Field Camera 3 on the Hubble Space Telescope. There have been many observations completed in x-ray and infrared imaging to discover new observations about this massive cluster. Like how the central dump is resolved into two different substructures -northwestern and southeastern- which are separated by a distance of ~150 kpc. This distance is immense, considering the distance from us on Earth to the Galactic center is only 7-10 kpc. To put this in perspective, our entire galaxy could fit 20 times between these two substructures, the actual diameter of 'SPT-CLJ2106' is much bigger than just this gap

The cluster has a redshift of z=1.132.

References

Galaxy clusters
Indus (constellation)